Sheykh Amer Rural District is a rural district (dehestan) in Chah Varz District, Lamerd County, Fars Province, Iran.

References 

Rural Districts of Fars Province
Lamerd County